Black Brook is a river in Otsego County, New York. It converges with Susquehanna River south-southwest of Cooperstown.

References

Rivers of New York (state)
Rivers of Otsego County, New York